Diereville (Dièreville, Sieur de Dièreville, Dière de Dièreville)  was a French surgeon, botanist and travel writer, born in France,
probably in Pont-l'Évêque, Calvados.

Dièreville is known mostly for his travels in Acadia from October 1699 to October 1700.
The plant genus, Diervilla, was named in honour of him by French botanist Tournefort

Dièreville wrote about his observations in Acadia in "Relation du voyage du Port Royal de l’Acadie, ou de la Nouvelle France"
which was first published in Rouen in 1708. It was re-published with notes by LU Fontaine in Quebec in 1885.

In 1933, the Champlain Society published another edition as part of its General Series, edited by John Clarence Webster, with English translation by Alice Webster.

References

External links
 A history of the island of Cape Breton: with some account of the discovery and settlement of Canada. Nova Scotia and Newfoundland
 Full text of Relation of the voyage to Port Royal in Acadia or New France from Digital Collection of the Champlain Society

17th-century births
18th-century deaths
People from Pont-l'Évêque, Calvados
People of New France
Explorers of Canada
French botanical writers
Acadian history
French male non-fiction writers